Rahan is a French comic series about an intelligent prehistoric man that first appeared as part of Pif gadget starting in March 1969, then published in albums of 2 to 4 complete stories. It was initially written by Roger Lecureux, and after his death in 1999, by Lecureux's son. Rahan has over 100 stories and lasted for 30 years.

The comics' illustrations are mainly drawn by André Chéret. Other artists who also contributed were Romero, Guy Zam  and José de Huescar . It had received a few adaptations over the years – notably adapted into a 2008 Italian-French animated television series, titled Rahan: Son of the Dark Age, produced by French animation studio Xilam Animation.

Premise
After the destruction of his tribe in a volcano eruption, Rahan moves from land to land while spreading goodwill amongst other humans. With his open altruism often at odds with his powerful will to survive, Rahan's ethic is encompassed by the qualities represented by the bear-claw necklace he received from his dying adoptive father, Crao: courage, loyalty, generosity, resilience and wisdom. After Rahan gets married, he receives a sixth claw, the claw of curiosity.

Rahan uses a variety of scientific methods to pick up bits of his knowledge (from nature) and spin it for a solution – for himself, for some human tribe or even to help some animals in distress. He invents the catapult, the net, the fishing pole, and lens. He diverts water for use in drinking and agriculture, flies on wings of leather, uses concave mirrors to concentrate the rays of the sun to heat caves and fight rampaging animals. In stark contrast to any other primitive story, which usually base around using stone as a major material, Rahan's adventure combines the positive social attitude of a true leader (being Rahan himself) with the inventive mind of a true scientist.

In other media 
In 1986, Rahan was adapted into an animated series by RMC Audiovisual, having a total of 26 episodes. Another animated series was made in 2008, developed as a children's animated series with many differences.

In 2006, a movie adaptation was planned, directed by Christophe Gans and starring Mark Dacascos in the titular role, but it had been postponed.

The black edition of Rahan was edited by Soleil Prod in 1998, serving as the "complete edition" of the series.

TV series
Xilam Animation, France 3, Rai Fiction and Castelrosso Films produced a television series titled Rahan: Son of the Dark Age.

Taking place in a singular storyline, Rahan travels through a world after a dawn of humankind, with two tribes vying for who will be in control. Along his journey, he is accompanied by a sidekick named Ursus. While magic was repeatedly shown in the comics to be an ignorant misinterpretation of physical phenomena, the Shadow Queen (or "Queen of Darkness") is an actual magic user and the main antagonist of the series.

Cast
 Scott McShane as Rahan
 Billy West as Ursus, Drak and Agar
 Phil LaMarr as Enok, Crao and Mogo
 Jess Harnell as Sanga, Guna and Bakur
 Elizabeth Daily as the Shadow Queen and Tetya
 Jessica DiCicco as Noama
 William Calvert as Daro and Bog

References

External links

2008 Series
Xilam page

French comics
1969 comics debuts
Comics characters introduced in 1969
Fictional prehistoric characters
Comics set in prehistory
Fictional French people
French comics characters
Jungle (genre) comics
Dinosaurs in comic books
Comics adapted into animated series
Comics adapted into television series
Male characters in comics
Prehistoric people in popular culture